The Men's keirin at the 2011 Dutch National Track Championships in Apeldoorn took place at Omnisport Apeldoorn on December 27, 2011.  19 athletes participated in the contest.

Roy van den Berg won the gold medal, Hugo Haak took silver and Matthijs Büchli won the bronze.

Competition format
The Keirin races involve 6.5 laps of the track behind a pace-setter, followed by a 2.5 lap sprint to the finish. The tournament consisted of preliminary heats and repechages, a semi-finals round, and the finals. The heats and repechages narrowed the field to 12. The semi-finals divided the remaining 12 into 6 finalists. The final round also included a ranking race for 7th to 12th place.

Results

Qualification
The top 2 athletes of each heat advanced to the semi-finals and the others to the repaches.

Heat 1

Heat 2

Heat 3

Heat 4

Repaches
The top 2 athletes of each heat advanced to the semi-finals.

Heat 1

Heat 2

Semi-finals
The top 3 athletes of each semi-final advanced to the gold medal match and the others to 7th – 12 classification match.

Semi-final 1

Semi-final 2

Finals
7th – 12th

Gold medal match

Final results

Results from nkbaanwielrennen.nl

References

2011 Dutch National track cycling championships
Dutch National Track Championships – Men's keirin